Pierre Arbaji (date of birth unknown, died before 2018) was a Lebanese sailor. He competed in the Finn event at the 1960 Summer Olympics.

References

External links
 

Lebanese male sailors (sport)
Olympic sailors of Lebanon
Sailors at the 1960 Summer Olympics – Finn
Sportspeople from Beirut
1921 births
1992 deaths